Charles Marie Jean Joseph Elvire Ghislain baron Poswick (6 October 1924 – 28 July 1994) was a Belgian politician for the PLP. Poswick was doctor in Law and licentiate in commercial and financial sciences.

He became para-commando and broker. Poswick was a member of parliament (1965–1991) for the PLP for the district Namur and President of the French community Council (1984–1985) and of the Walloon district Council (1985–1988). He was minister of defence from 1966 up to 1968 and in 1980.

Sources
 Charles Poswick (In French)
 Charles Poswick (Liberal Archive, in Dutch)
 Van Molle, P., Het Belgisch parlement 1894–1969, Gent, Erasmus, 1969, p. 276.
 Kamer van Volksvertegenwoordigers. Officieel Handboek, 1988, p. 161.

1924 births
1994 deaths
Belgian Ministers of Defence